The Southern Railway of British Columbia, branded as SRY Rail Link  is a Canadian short line railway operating in southwestern British Columbia. The main facility is the port at Annacis Island with major import of cars, export of forestry products, and other shipments. The railway has interconnections with three Class I railroads, including Canadian Pacific (CP), Canadian National (CN) and Burlington Northern Santa Fe (BNSF). It operates a fleet of 29 locomotives, mostly consisting of EMD GP-9 and SW900 locomotives. SRY also currently rosters 3 SD38-2s, an SD38AC and an SD35. Additionally, SRY formerly rostered 4 GMD1s. The railroad also operates a fleet 2,000 rail cars, hauling approximately 70,000 carloads per year.

History

The Provincial government sold the railway to the Itel Rail Group in 1988.  The railway was renamed the Southern Railway of British Columbia. The line was originally built in 1910 as the British Columbia Electric Railway (BCER), an interurban trolley service for passengers (until 1950s) as well as for freight such as farm produce. The railway was taken over by Crown corporation BC Hydro in 1961, and was known as the BC Hydro Railway. In 1988 Freight rights, rolling stock and Rails were sold to Itel of Chicago with protected passenger rights at no cost. In 1994, it was bought by Washington Group International but kept the SRY name. The Washington Group has since merged with URS. 
To this day the Province and BC Hydro retain the right to reintroduce passenger service. In recent years, with congestion and growing environmental concerns, there has been increasing demand for this service, and willingness to pay, from persons wishing to travel among Fraser Valley communities other than by private automobile. In 2019, the South Fraser Community Rail campaign was being launched, promoted by former BC premier Bill Vander Zalm and former Langley mayor Rick Green, to resurrect passenger service to Chilliwack using the former BCER right-of-way.

See also

 Southern Railway of Vancouver Island, a sister system to SRY.

References

External links

 Southern Railway of British Columbia
 Southern Railway of BC Locomotive Roster
 BC Electric, BC Hydro, Southern British Columbia

British Columbia railways